= Logtung mine =

Mine in Yukon, Canada

Northern Dancer
- Location within Yukon
- Location: Yukon, Canada; 60°0′19″N 131°55′32″W
- Products: Tungsten and molybdenum
- Company: Largo Resources

The Northern Dancer Project, formerly also called the Logtung property, is a planned open pit tungsten and molybdenum mine located in southern Yukon, Canada. Northern Dancer represents one of the largest tungsten deposits in Canada, having an indicated resource of 140.8 million tonnes of ore grading 0.10% tungsten and 0.026% molybdenum. As of October 2014, Northern Dancer is wholly owned by the Toronto-based Largo Resources company.
